Skogfjorden is a Norwegian language village and campsite affiliated with the Concordia Language Villages. It is located at the Concordia site at Turtle River Lake near Bemidji, Minnesota, United States.  Skogfjorden is a village for language immersion where American villagers come to live and experience Norwegian language and culture.

Skogfjorden promise
The staff of Skogfjorden make this promise to the villagers and to one another. It is the foundation of the entire program.
I am responsible and accountable for establishing and maintaining our vibrant Skogfjorden community, where:

Everyone is and feels safe;
Everyone belongs;
Norwegian is at the heart of everything we do;
Connections to Norway are affirmed, refreshed, and expanded; and
Teamwork is built upon individual contributions.

International recognition
The Ambassador of Norway, Knut Vollebæk, visited the village in 2003.

His Majesty King Harald V of Norway has granted royal patronage to Skogfjorden. Patronage is an affirmation from the Royal Family of Norway of the quality educational programming of Concordia Language Villages.

In 2009, Tove I. Dahl, the dean of Skogfjorden, was named a Knight of the First Class of the Royal Norwegian Order of Merit, by His Majesty King Harald V of Norway, for the advancement of Norwegian language and culture in the United States. Dahl is a professor of educational psychology at the University of Tromsø and is married to Curt Rice.

History
Concordia Language Villages began offering Norwegian programs in 1963 and opened an architecturally-authentic, year-round Norwegian Language Village on Turtle River Lake near Bemidji, Minnesota in 1971.

References

External links
 Concordia Language Villages
 Village Pages:Skogfjorden
 Skogfjorden Flickr
 Skogfjorden Youtube

Concordia Language Villages
Norwegian language